Erasmus Saunders may refer to:

 Erasmus Saunders (priest, died 1724), Welsh priest and writer
 Erasmus Saunders (priest, died 1775), his son, Canon of Windsor, 1751–1756